At the Movies: 1959–1974 is a 1996 double-CD compilation album by Cliff Richard, featuring songs that he performed in his various movie appearances.

Track listing

CD 1
 "No Turning Back"	2:28
 "Living Doll"	2:37
 "Mad About You"	1:44
 "Love"	2:23
 "A Voice in the Wilderness"	2:10
 "The Shrine on the Second Floor"	2:26
 "Friday Night"	2:50
 "Got a Funny Feeling"	2:52
 "Nothing's Impossible"	3:26
 "The Young Ones	3:07
 "Lessons in Love"	2:48
 "When the Girl in Your Arms"	2:23
 "We Say Yeah"	2:11
 "(It's) Wonderful to Be Young"	2:35
 "Outsider"	2:43
 "Seven Days to a Holiday"	3:10
 "Summer Holiday"	2:08
 "Let Us Take You for a Ride"	4:36
 "A Stranger in Town"	2:33
 "Bachelor Boy"	1:59
 "A Swingin' Affair"	4:16
 "Dancing Shoes"	2:07
 "The Next Time"	2:56
 "Big News"	1:54
 "Wonderful Life"	2:26
 "A Girl in Every Port"	2:47
 "A Little Imagination"	1:15
 "On the Beach"	2:30
 "Do You Remember"	2:48

CD 2
 "Look Don't Touch"	1:41
 "In The Stars"	3:57
 "What've I Gotta Do"	2:30
 "A Matter of Moments"	2:56
 "Wonderful Life"	2:19
 "Shooting Star"	2:37
 "Finders Keepers"	2:36
 "Time Drags By"	2:31
 "Washerwoman"	2:06
 "La La La Song"	2:26
 "Oh Senorita"	4:14
 "This Day"	2:58
 "Paella"	2:50
 "Two a Penny"	2:43
 "Twist and Shout"	2:37
 "I'll Love You Forever Today"	3:02
 "Questions"	2:48
 "It's Only Money"	2:39
 "Midnight Blue"	3:41
 "The Game"	3:10
 "Brumburger Duet"	1:39
 "Take Me High"	2:41
 "The Anti-Brotherhood of Man"	1:29
 "Winning"	3:25
 "The Young Ones" (Film version)	2:40*
 "Lessons in Love" (Edited film version)	1:58*
 "Bachelor Boy" (Film version)	1:58*
 "Summer Holiday" (End title film version)	1:20*

Tracks marked with an asterisk are bonus tracks on the CD box release.

Charts

References

Cliff Richard compilation albums
1996 compilation albums
EMI Records compilation albums